The 1980–81 Nationalliga A season was the 43rd season of the Nationalliga A, the top level of ice hockey in Switzerland. Eight teams participated in the league, and EHC Biel won the championship.

First round

Final round

Relegation

External links
 Championnat de Suisse 1980/81

Swiss
National League (ice hockey) seasons
1980–81 in Swiss ice hockey